Lacrosse is a team sport.

Lacrosse or LaCrosse may also refer to:

Places in the United States
 LaCrosse, Arkansas
 LaCrosse, Florida

People
 Benji LaCrosse (born 1977), American race car driver
 Dave LaCrosse (born 1955), American football player
 Jean-Baptiste Raymond de Lacrosse (1761–1829), French admiral during the French Revolutionary and Napoleonic Wars

Other
 Lacrosse (album), an album by John Zorn
 "Lacrosse" (song), the only song (in multiple versions) on the album Lacrosse
 Lacrosse (satellite), a National Reconnaissance Office satellite
 Buick LaCrosse, an automobile produced by General Motors
 MGM-18 Lacrosse, a US Army missile used 1959–1964
 LaCrosse Footwear, a shoe company based in Oregon, USA

See also
 Lacrosse Hall of Fame (disambiguation)
 
 LCROSS (Lunar Crater Observation and Sensing Satellite)
 La Crosse (disambiguation)